An early system of plant taxonomy, the Lindley system, was first published by John Lindley as An Introduction to the Natural System of Botany (Natural History, 1830). This was a minor modification of that of de Candolle (1813). He developed this further over a number of publications, including the Nixus plantarum (1833) and a second edition of Natural History (1836), in which he introduced the concept of a higher order of taxonomic rank, the Alliances, in which he embedded the Tribes (families). He also expanded his ideas on Exogens in his entry of that name in the Penny Cyclopedia (1838). In 1839 he revised his division of the plant kingdom into classes in an article in the Botanical Register. Lindley's system culminated in the three editions of his Vegetable Kingdom (1846, 1847, 1853).

The schema of the Natural History is shown on pages xxxv and xxxvii-xlviii. In the Vegetable Kingdom, the schema for the first edition is on pp. lv–lxviii. The third and final edition was published in 1853, with the schema on p. lv. Cross references from Natural History to Vegetable Kingdom in [Square brackets].

Summary

An Introduction to the Natural History of Botany (1830) 
Schema p. xxxv,
Outline p. xxxvii
Index p. 345
Genera organised into Orders (referred to as Tribes, in English)
 Class I: Vasculares (Flowering plants) p. 1
 Subclass I: Exogenae (Dicotyledons) p. 1
 Tribe I. Angiospermae p. 2
 Tribe II. Gymnospermae p. 245
 Subclass II: Endogenae (Monocotyledons) p. 251
 Tribe I Petaloideae p. 252
 Tribe II Glumaceae
 Class II: Cellulares (Flowerless plants)
 1. Filicoideae
 2. Muscoideae
 3. Aphyllae
 Index to Introduction to Natural History p. 345

Vegetable Kingdom (1846–1853)
Summary of previous systems p. xxxv (see Notes)
Schema for 1846 and 1853 p. lv
Genera organised into Alliances and Orders
Flowerless plants (Asexual)
 Class I: Thallogens
 Class II: Acrogens
Flowering plants (Sexual)
 Class III: Rhizogens
 Class IV: Endogens
 Class V: Dictyogens
 Class VI: Gymnogens
 Class VII: Exogens
Index to Vegetable Kingdom p. 833

Natural History orders (1830–1836) 

165 orders (list p. 3)

Class I: Vasculares: Flowering plants 
p. 1

Subclass I: Exogenae (Dicotyledons) 
 Tribe I. Angiospermae p. 2
 Polypetale 165 orders p. 2
 Thalamiflorae 
 Apocarpae
 23. Menispermeae p. 31
 ...
 117. Coriarieae p. 135
 Syncarpae
 5. Nymphaeaceae
 ...
 130. Violaceae (Violets) p. 146
 ...
 107. Humiriaceae
 Calyciflorae
 Apocarpae
 38. Saxifrageae
 ...
 147. Crassulaceae
 Syncarpae
 132. Malesherbiaceae
 ...
 1. Araliaceae (Aralia) p. 4
 ...
 58. Alangieae
 Apetale
 Aristolochiae
 ...
 Empetreae
 Achlamydeae
 Podostemeae
 ....
 Piperaceae
 Monopetale
 Gesnereae
 ...
 Orobancheae
 Tribe II. Gymnospermae p. 245
 Coniferae
 Cycadeae

Subclass II: Endogenae (Monocotyledons) 
Endogenae, or Monocotyledonous Plants p. 251
 Tribe I  Petaloideae 32 orders p. 252
(May be Tripetaloideous, Hexapetaloideous or Spadiceous)
 Tripetaloideae 8 orders
 230 Butomeae (p. 253) [Alismales 208] 
 229 Alismaceae (p. 253) [Alismales 209]
 232 Commelineae (p. 255) [Xyridales 188]
 233 Xyrideae (p. 255) [Xyridales 187]
 231 Hydrocharideae (p. 254) [Hydrales 141]
 234 Bromeliaceae (p. 256) [Narcissales 147]
 241 Scitamineae (p. 265)
 242 Marantaceae (p. 267) [Amomales 168]
 Hexapetaloideae(17 orders)
 235: Hypoxideae
 236: Burmannieae (p. 257)
 237: Haemodoraceae (Blood-root tribe) p. 258*** 239: Irideae (Cornflag tribe) p. 260
 238: Amaryllideae (Narcissus tribe) p. 259*** 240: Orchideae
 239: Irideae (p. 260) [Narcissales 159]
 240 Orchideae (p. 262) [Orchidales 173]
.....
 243 Musaceae (p. 269)
 235 Hypoxideae (p. 257) [Narcissales 154]
 238 Amaryllideae (p. 259) [Narcissales 155]
 237 Haemadoraceae (p. 258) [Narcissales 155]
 ............
 ............
 244 Junceae (p. 270) [Juncales 191]
 247 Asphodeleae (p. 273) [Liliaceae 200]
 248 Gilliesieae (p. 275) [Liliales 196]
 251 Liliaceae (p. 279) [Liliales 200]
 249 Smilaceae (p. 277)
 253 Restiaceae (p. 283) [Glumales 121] - Glumaceae
 Spadiceae (7 orders)
 254 Pandaneae p. 284
 255 Typhaceae p. 285
 256 Aroideae  p. 286
 257 Balanophoreae p. 288
 258 Fluviales p. 289
 259 Juncagineae p. 290 
 259 Pistiaceae p. 291 [Arales 124]
 Tribe II Glumaceae 2 orders p. 292 [Glumales 105] 
 Cyperaceae [107]
 Gramineae p. 292 [Graminaceae 106]

Class II: Cellulares: Flowerless plants 
p. 307
 1. Filicoideae, or Fern-like plants 
 Equisetaceae
 Filices
 Lycopodiaceae
 Marsileaceae
 2. Muscoideae, or Moss-like plants
 Musci
 Hepaticae
 Characeae
 3. Aphyllae
 Lichenes
 Fungi
 Algae

Vegetable Kingdom alliances and orders  (1846–1853) 
(pages refer to 1853 edition)

Flowerless plants 
p. 5

Class I: Thallogens 
3 Alliances
 Algales p. 8
 Diatomaceae
 ...
 Characeae
 Fungales, Fungi p. 29
 Hymenomycetes
 ...
 Physomycetes
 Lichenales, Lichens p. 45
 Graphidaceae
 Collemaceae
 Parmeliaceae

Class II: Acrogens 
3 Alliances p. 51
 Muscales, or Moss-like plants p. 54
  Hepaticae
 Ricciaceae
 ...
 Equisetaceae, Horsetails
 Musci
 Andraeaceae
 Bryaceae
 Lycopodales p. 68
 Lycopodaceae
 Marsileaceae
 Filicales p. 74
 Ophioglossaceae
 Polypodiaceae, Ferns
 Danaeaceae

Flowering plants

Class III: Rhizogens 
3 orders p. 83
 Balanophoraceae p. 88
 Cytinaceae p. 91
 Rafflesiaceae p. 93

Class IV: Endogens (Monocotyledons) 
11 Alliances p. 95
 Glumales 5 orders p. 105
 Graminaceae, Grasses
 Cyperaceae, Sedges
 ...
 Eriocaulaceae, Pipeworts
 Arales 4 orders p. 123
 Pistiaceae
 Typhaceae
 Araceae
 Pandanaceae
 Palmales, Palms 1 order p. 133
 Palmaceae
 Hydrales 4 orders p. 140
 Hydrocharidaceae
 Naiadaceae
 Triuridaceae
 Zosteraceae
 Narcissales 6 orders p. 146 
 Bromeliaceae p. 147
 Taccaceae
 Haemodoraceae
 Hypoxidaceae p. 154
 Amaryllidaceae, Amaryllids 4 tribes 68 genera 400 species p. 155
 Amarylleae
 Narcisseae
 Alstromerieae
 Agaveae
 Iridaceae p. 159 (53 Genera, 550 species)
 Amomales 3 orders p. 162
 Musaceae
 Zingiberaceae
 Marantaceae
 Orchidales 3 orders p. 170
 Burmanniaceae
 Orchidaceae, Orchids
 Apostasiaceae
 Xyridales 4 orders p. 185
 Philydraceae
 ....
 Mayaceae
 Juncales 2 orders p. 190
 Juncaceae, Rushes
 Orontiaceae
 Liliales p. 195 4 orders
 Gilliesiaceae p. 196
 Melanthaceae
 Liliaceae, Lilyworts 11 tribes 133 genera 1200 species p. 200
 I Tulipeae
 ...
 IV Scilleae
 ...
 IX Asparageae
 ...
 XI Ophiopogoneae
 Pontederaceae
 Alismales 3 orders p. 207
 Butomaceae
 Alismaceae
 Juncaginaceae

Class V: Dictyogens 
5 orders p. 211
 Dioscoreaceae, Yams p. 214
 ...
 Roxburghiaceae

Class VI: Gymnogens 
4 orders p. 221
 Cycadaceae, Cycads
 Pinaceae, Conifers p. 226
 Taxaceae
 Gnetaceae

Class VII: Exogens 
4 subclasses
 Sub-class I: Diclinous Exogens 8 alliances p. 249
 Sub-class II: Hypogynous Exogens 13 alliances p. 325
 Alliance 26: Violales p. 325
 Family 116: Violaceae p. 338
 Sub-class III: Perigynous Exogens 10 alliances p. 523
 48. Echiales p. 649
 Family 258: Boraginaceae p. 655 
 Sub-class IV: Epigynous Exogens 7 alliances p. 688

Notes
His final schemata is illustrated in the Vegetable Kingdom, his last work, on pages lv-lxvii. In this work he also reviews all his previous publications relative to the many known systems published at that time.

References

Bibliography 

 
 
 

A Natural System of Botany (1830–1836)
 
 

The Vegetable Kingdom (1846–1853)
 
 
 

system, Lindley